Rise Park  is an area of Romford, a district in the London Borough of Havering. It is one of a series of parks which stretch northwards from the railway line at Romford. The southern entrance to Rise Park is just north of the A12 Eastern Avenue, and the northern entrance is on Lower Bedfords Road. It does have a further four other entrances located in Beauly Way, Dee Way, Garry Close, and Isbell Gardens. Rise Park has a significant number of bungalows located in the area. There has been a number of new housing developments in the area.

Parks and open spaces in the London Borough of Havering
Areas of London
Districts of the London Borough of Havering
Romford